Rape of the Belt is a 1964 Australian television film based on the play by Benn Levy.

Plot
Heracles and Theseus, two celebrated heroes, arrive at Themiscyra, the Amazons' capital, to accomplish the ninth of the Labours of Heracles, stealing Hippolyte's belt. They are confronted by Antiope and Hippolyte.

Cast
Tony Ward as Heracles
Reg Livermore as Theseus
Fernande Glyn as Antiope, the Amazonian Queen
Arlene Dorgan as Hippolyte
Neva Carr Glyn as Hera
Chris Christensen as Zeus
Sheila Kennelly as Hippobomene
Ethel Lang as Thalestris
Victoria Anoux as Anthea
Susanne Haworth as Diasta

Production
Benn Levy's play had been performed by the Elizabethan Theatre Trust in 1960. Star Tony Ward was best known at the time for presenting the show Seven Days. Ward worked out for two months and grew a beard for the role. He injured his leg and used crutches during rehearsals.

Some scenes were shot as Kurnell and Whale Beach.

It was an early TV role for Reg Livermore.

Reception
The Sydney Morning Herald called it "amusingly lively and buoyant."

Filmink called it "a fun watch".

References

External links

Australian television films
Australian Broadcasting Corporation original programming
Black-and-white Australian television shows
English-language television shows
Films directed by Henri Safran
1964 television films
1964 films
Films about Heracles
Films set in ancient Greece